Millin is a surname. Notable people with the surname include:

Aubin-Louis Millin de Grandmaison (1759–1818), antiquary and naturalist erudite in various domains
Bill Millin (1922–2010), personal piper to Simon Fraser, 15th Lord Lovat, commander of 1 Special Service Brigade at D-Day
Henry Millin (1923–2004), U.S. Virgin Islander banker and politician
Kay Cathrine Millin Brownbill OBE (1914–2002), Australian politician
Ken Millin (born 1975), lacrosse player for the Rochester Knighthawks in the National Lacrosse League
Lori Millin, Democratic member of the Wyoming House of Representatives, representing the 8th district from 2007 to 2011
Sarah Millin, née Liebson (1889–1968), Kimberley, South African-born writer
Terence Millin (1903–1980), Irish surgeon

See also
Milin, Breton surname, its equivalent, "milin" meaning mill
Akdamus Millin, prominent Aramaic liturgical poem recited annually on the Jewish holiday of Shavuos by Ashkenazi Jews
Mallin
Meilin (disambiguation)
Mellin
Miellin
Millen (disambiguation)
Milling (disambiguation)
Million
Mullin